The second season of Phineas and Ferb premiered on Disney XD on February 19, 2009. A preview of the season was shown on Toon Disney on January 23, 2009, with the episode "Tip of the Day". The season features two step-brothers on summer vacation trying to make every day the best day ever, while their sister tries to bust them. The five main characters are: brothers Phineas Flynn and Ferb Fletcher, their older sister Candace Flynn, secret agent Perry the Platypus, and the evil Dr. Heinz Doofenshmirtz.

Recurring characters include across-the-street neighbor Isabella Garcia-Shapiro, the boys' mom Linda Flynn-Fletcher, their father Lawrence Fletcher, Perry's boss, Major Monogram, Jeremy Johnson, Baljeet, Buford Van Stomm, Stacy Hirano, Ducky Momo, and many more.

Production

The season was first announced in May 2008, originally with 26 episodes.

Episodes

Ratings
The episodes "Perry Lays an Egg and Gaming the System" on the Disney Channel achieved the most views by ages 6–11 and 9–14 of any channel in that night's time slot. This achievement propelled the series to the number one animated telecast that week for the target demographics. On June 7, 2009, Disney announced that the show had become the number one prime-time animated television show for the demographics 6–11 and 9–14.

The premiere of "Phineas and Ferb Christmas Vacation" garnered 2.62 million viewers during its debut on Disney XD, the most watched telecast in the channel's history (including Toon Disney) and the number three program of the night in all demographics. It received 5.2 million viewers for its debut on Disney Channel. It was the highest rated episode of the series to date.

The premiere of "Phineas and Ferb: Summer Belongs To You!" garnered 3.862 million viewers, was watched by 22% of kids 2–11, 13% of teens 12-17, 5% of households, and 3% of adults 18–49, also being the #1 program on that night and it was 25th for the week in viewership. On Disney XD, the episode ranked in the channel's top 3 telecasts of the year in viewers with 1.32 million, and Boys 6–11 with 365,000, with a 2.9 rating. The hour telecast on August 2, 2010 is currently the Emmy-winning animated series' No. 2 telecast of all time on Disney XD in Total Viewers, in kids 6–14 with 677,000 and a 1.9 rating, Boys 6–14 with 435,000 and a 2.3 rating,  and kids 6–11 with 542,000 and a 2.2 rating, Boys 6–11 and Boys 9–14 235,000 with a 1.9 rating, behind only December 2009's "Phineas and Ferb Christmas Vacation".

DVD releases

See also

Notes

References

General references

External links 

2009 American television seasons
2010 American television seasons
2011 American television seasons
 

hu:A Phineas és Ferb epizódjainak listája
pl:Lista odcinków serialu animowanego Fineasz i Ferb
ro:Lista episoadelor din Phineas şi Ferb
vi:Danh sách các tập phim Phineas and Ferb